The 2018 FIFA World Cup qualification UEFA Group A was one of the nine UEFA groups for 2018 FIFA World Cup qualification. The group consisted of six teams: Netherlands, France, Sweden, Bulgaria, Belarus, and Luxembourg.

The draw for the first round (group stage) was held as part of the 2018 FIFA World Cup Preliminary Draw on 25 July 2015, starting 18:00 MSK (UTC+3), at the Konstantinovsky Palace in Strelna, Saint Petersburg, Russia.

The group winners, France, qualified directly for the 2018 FIFA World Cup. The group runners-up, Sweden, advanced to the play-offs as one of the best eight runners-up.

Standings

Matches
The fixture list was confirmed by UEFA on 26 July 2015, the day following the draw. Times are CET/CEST, as listed by UEFA (local times are in parentheses).

Goalscorers
There were 93 goals scored in 30 matches, for an average of  goals per match.

8 goals

 Marcus Berg

6 goals

 Arjen Robben

4 goals

 Olivier Giroud
 Antoine Griezmann
 Aurélien Joachim
 Emil Forsberg

3 goals

 Georgi Kostadinov
 Memphis Depay
 Quincy Promes
 Davy Pröpper
 Andreas Granqvist
 Mikael Lustig
 Ola Toivonen

2 goals

 Pavel Savitski
 Ivaylo Chochev
 Spas Delev
 Ivelin Popov
 Kevin Gameiro
 Thomas Lemar
 Dimitri Payet
 Paul Pogba
 Vincent Janssen
 Wesley Sneijder

1 goal

 Alexei Rios
 Anton Saroka
 Mikhail Sivakow
 Maksim Valadzko
 Mihail Aleksandrov
 Stanislav Manolev
 Marcelinho
 Dimitar Rangelov
 Aleksandar Tonev
 Blaise Matuidi
 Kylian Mbappé
 Florian Bohnert
 Maxime Chanot
 Daniel da Mota
 Olivier Thill
 Davy Klaassen
 Georginio Wijnaldum
 Jimmy Durmaz
 Oscar Hiljemark
 Isaac Kiese Thelin
 Victor Lindelöf
 Christoffer Nyman

Discipline
A player was automatically suspended for the next match for the following offences:
 Receiving a red card (red card suspensions could be extended for serious offences)
 Receiving two yellow cards in two different matches (yellow card suspensions were carried forward to the play-offs, but not the finals or any other future international matches)

The following suspensions were served during the qualifying matches:

Notes

References

External links

Qualifiers – Europe: Round 1, FIFA.com
FIFA World Cup, UEFA.com
Standings – Qualifying round: Group A, UEFA.com

A
France at the 2018 FIFA World Cup
Sweden at the 2018 FIFA World Cup